Catriona Shearer is a Scottish broadcast journalist and producer, who was a presenter on BBC Scotland's national news programme Reporting Scotland.

Early life 
Shearer graduated from Edinburgh Napier University with a BA (Hons) degree in Journalism.

Career 
After her graduation at Napier University in 2003, Shearer moved to London and joined BBC Radio 5 Live as a journalist and producer for the station's flagship news programmes - 5 Live Breakfast, Drive, The Midday News, and Weekend Breakfast. She later moved to Cardiff, working for BBC Radio Wales as a co-presenter for the Saturday afternoon sports show Sportstime and a producer on the station's entertainment, music and features output.

Shearer later joined BBC Radio Scotland as a producer for news programmes Newsdrive and Scotland Live and presented traffic updates during the flagship breakfast programme Good Morning Scotland. She also presented a weekly online video podcast and worked on the radio quiz show Soundbites before becoming a television news presenter in 2007. Shearer currently presents Reporting Scotlands breakfast bulletins on weekdays and is a stand-in anchor for the main 6:30pm evening programme. 

Alongside Reporting Scotland, Shearer has also been involved with several BBC Scotland non-news programmes, including presenting a documentary on Pope Benedict XVI's tour visit to Scotland and a guest appearance on the football comedy series Only An Excuse?. As a keen music fan, she has also presented BBC Radio Scotland's overnight New Music Zone strand and has contributed to Kruger magazine and Gigwise. She is also a columnist for the Sunday edition of The Scottish Sun.

In May 2021, Shearer revealed on Twitter she would be leaving BBC Scotland after 16 years.

References

External links 
 Catriona Shearer at bbc.co.uk

Living people
BBC Scotland newsreaders and journalists
British women television journalists
Scottish radio presenters
Scottish women television presenters
Scottish television presenters
Scottish women radio presenters
Scottish women journalists
Alumni of Edinburgh Napier University
Year of birth missing (living people)